Sofia Mikhaylivna Tarasova (born 31 March 2001) is a Ukrainian singer and actress. She represented Ukraine at the Junior Eurovision Song Contest 2013, with the song "We Are One", placing 2nd overall with 121 points.

In October 2020, she became a member of the new line-up of the long-running Ukrainian girl group Nu Virgos.

Early life 
Sofia Tarasova was born on 31 March 2001 in Kyiv, the capital of Ukraine, to Russian parents from Saint Petersburg. She began to display vocal talents at the age of two and a half, whereupon her perfect pitch ensured her entrance into a group for gifted children at the prestigious Reinhold M. Gliere Music College in her hometown. Subsequently, 4-year old Tarasova successfully passed an examination to enter the preparatory division of the Academy of Arts, allowing her to study in the fields of music, choreography and art. Moreover, at age 6, Tarasova joined the "Chunga-Changa" show theatre, which provided the singer with acting classes and the opportunity to perform leading roles in musicals. In a 2013 biography, the singer stated "Gerda" in The Snow Queen was a favourite theatrical role. At ten, she entered the "PARADIZ" centre, where she, as of 2013, took place for tuition in voice, choreography, modelling and acting.

Musical career

2012: The Voice of Ukraine Junior, Junior Eurovision 2012 and Euro Pop Contest 2012
In 2012, Tarasova won Holos. Dity, the children's edition of the Ukrainian version of The Voice. In the same year, she also took part in the Ukrainian national selection for the Junior Eurovision Song Contest 2012 with the song "Zhityeviy Pazl" (Puzzle of Life), but was not chosen to represent the nation. Tarasova also represented her country for the first time at the Euro Pop Contest, a singing contest held in Berlin, that has a similar format to the Eurovision Song Contest.

2013: New Wave Junior, Eurovision Music Academy and Junior Eurovision 2013

Tarasova won the VI International Pop Performers Competition "New Wave Junior" in 2013, and in the same year she also won the "Eurovision Music Academy".
On 2 August 2013, Sofia competed in the Ukrainian selection for the 2013 contest with her song "We Are One," finishing first in a field of 20 candidates, winning the right to represent her nation. Tarasova's song placed 2nd with 121 points.

2014: "Ver' mne" and Euro Pop Contest 2014

In late April of 2014, Tarasova released a new original song called "Ver' mne" (Believe me).  The music video was released on 21 May 2014. Tarasova was chosen to read the points for Ukraine at the Junior Eurovision Song Contest 2014 in Marsa, Malta on 15 November.

Tarasova competed for the second time at the Euro Pop Contest and on 1 December 2014 she won first place in the 10–13 category. She was to be a member of the Ukrainian jury for the Eurovision Song Contest 2017, but withdrew due to personal reasons.

2018: The Voice
In October 2018, Tarasova decided to compete in season 7 of Golos, the Russian version of The Voice. She performed "I'm Your Baby Tonight" by Whitney Houston, leading all four coaches choosing her, after which she selected to be a part of Team Konstantin. In the Battle round, Tarasova competed against Ekaterina Korotkova in their joint cover of "Obiymy" (Обiйми; lit. Embrace) by Okean Elzy. Tarasova won the battle, thus reaching the knockout stage. During the knockout performance, Tarasova sang "Ty otpusti" (Ты отпусти; lit. You let go) by Tina Karol, and later qualified for the live shows. During the quarterfinal, Tarasova sang "Amerikanskaya zhena" (Американская жена; lit. American wife) from the movie Stilyagi, in which she qualified for the next round. In the semi-final, she performed "We Are the World" by USA for Africa. Despite positive feedback from the coaches, Tarasova was eliminated from the semi-final.

2019: Solo career 
She started performing under the pseudonym SOFA and released three singles "Мы стоим у воды" (We're standing by the water), "Киев-Москва" (Kiev-Moscow), and "Харизма" (Charisma). "Не обижай меня" (Don't hurt me) and the feature song "Одуванчиков поле" (Dandelion Field) were released afterwards.

2020–present: VIA Gra 
On 6 November 2020, Tarasova joined the Ukrainian pop group Nu Virgos.

Discography

Singles

Solo

As featured artist

With Nu Virgos

Music videos
 2014 – Ver' mne
 2014 – Zminyty vse
 2014 – We Are One (English version only)
 2014 – Mir bez voyny (with members of Respublika Kids and Open Kids)
 2016 – Letet' vysoko
 2018 – Leave Me Alone

References

2001 births
Living people
Ukrainian pop singers
Junior Eurovision Song Contest entrants
Junior Eurovision Song Contest entrants for Ukraine
Ukrainian stage actresses
Ukrainian child actresses
Ukrainian child singers
Ukrainian people of Russian descent
English-language singers from Ukraine
21st-century Ukrainian women singers